Siren is an American fantasy drama television series that follows Ryn Fisher (played by Eline Powell), a young siren who comes to a small coastal town looking for her abducted older sister. The series premiered on Freeform on March 29, 2018. The first season included 10 episodes. In May 2019, the series was renewed for a third season which premiered on April 2, 2020. The series was canceled in August 2020.

Premise
The coastal town of Bristol Cove, Washington, known for its legends of once being home to mermaids and mermen for centuries, is turned upside down when a mysterious young woman (Eline Powell) appears and begins wreaking havoc upon the small fishing town to look for her captured older sister (Sibongile Mlambo) who was abducted at the hands of the local military. Marine biologists Ben (Alex Roe) and Maddie (Fola Evans-Akingbola) work together to find out who and what drove this primal hunter of the deep sea to land.

By Season Two, more merpeople started appearing in Bristol Cove due to the pollution in the nearby waters and the sonic waves from the oil rig. Additionally, Pownall's paralysis is gradually being counteracted by Ryn's mermaid stem cells.

In Season Three, Ben, Maddie and Ryn contend with the mermaid Tia (Tiffany Lonsdale) who plans to coerce all merpeople tribes/colonies to join her in her fight to overthrow humanity. And Ryn's daughter, who has been carried by a surrogate, must be protected at all costs. To further escalate matters, Ted Pownall has finally acknowledged the existence of merpeople and seems to be on a dangerous path, just as his great-great-great-grandfather had.

Cast and characters

Main
 Alex Roe as Ben Pownall, a marine biologist who helps Ryn when she first comes to shore. He is entranced by her melodious, irresistibly hypnotic siren song, which she deploys on him as a defense mechanism without knowing the full extent of its effects on humans. Ben later becomes Ryn's lover, and his struggle to untangle his affection for her from the obsessive thoughts that result from hearing her siren song becomes a significant part of his character arc. To help Ryn and her kind, he resorts to injecting himself with the stem cells of a partially transformed mermaid corpse and subsequently develops abilities found in merpeople – heightened hearing and reflexes, accelerated healing, and the ability to hold his breath for extended periods of time. At the end of season 3, following the fight against Tia, Ben goes missing in the ocean.
 Eline Powell as Ryn Fisher, a strange young adult mermaid with a dark secret. She comes ashore in search of her elder sister, who has been accidentally captured by fishermen of the North Star fishing vessel. She eventually comes to realize that not all humans are murderous, and becomes Ben and Maddie's lover. To help Ben's mother Elaine, she willingly donates her aquatic stem cells to help counteract the paralysis in Elaine's legs. Upon mating with a bearded merman of another colony when she couldn't find Levi, she has a daughter named Hope.
 Fola Evans-Akingbola as Maddie Bishop, a marine biologist and Ben's girlfriend in season one and two. She works at Bristol Cove Marine Research Center with Ben. Her father is the sheriff of Bristol Cove. Her estranged mother is Susan, who returns after nine months in Season 2. Like Ben, Maddie is entranced by Ryn's melodious, irresistibly hypnotic siren song but doesn't seem to develop the same feelings of possessiveness as a result. She later becomes Ryn's lover.
 Ian Verdun as Xander McClure, a deep-sea fisherman who seeks to discover the truth about the existence of mermaids and mermen. He eventually joins the Bristol Cove Sheriff Department in an attempt to save those he cares about more against the enemy merpeople. In season 3, following the death of Dale, Xander is sworn in as the new Sheriff of Bristol Cove.
 Sibongile Mlambo as Donna (season 1; special guest star season 3), a mystical and deceptively powerful mermaid who is Ryn's older sister. She was unintentionally caught in a fishing net and taken by the military. She was killed, unintentionally, by Xander. Her spirit eventually contacts Helen from the merpeople's version of the spirit world when her body has been grave-robbed. Her ghost later instructs Cami and those on Ryn's side to help Ryn fight Tia.
 Rena Owen as Helen Hawkins, an eccentric woman who seems to know much more about the merfolk than she claims. It is revealed that she is descended from merfolk and shares ancestry with Ben and the other Pownalls. She eventually learns that she has a long-lost relative from the Marzdan family, most of whom are known as hybrids. She discovers that her mother Daphne was one of the merpeople/human hybrids who was promised to fellow hybrid Johnathon Rooney, but had chosen Helen's human father instead. This resulted in the death of Mr. Hawkins, a few weeks before Helen was born. She is eventually contacted by the spirit of her merman love Sarge and, later, Donna's. It is later revealed that she is, in fact, the great-granddaughter of the half mermaid/human daughter of Charles Pownall and his mermaid lover, from her mother's side.
 Tiffany Lonsdale as Tia (season 3), a new mermaid from another colony/tribe of the northern seas around Bristol Cove, Washington. The human locals refer to her as a "sea monster". Her intent on arriving on land is to coerce all other merpeople tribes and colonies to join her in putting an end to humans or perish by her wrath. She choose her name from Tiamat, Water Deity of the Seas. In the past, Tia was caught by humans while she was pregnant and she lost her unborn child as a result of how she was treated. As of "Survivor" and "Life and Death," she has since gained leadership of her own colony and is now bent on unifying all fellow merpeople colonies/tribes to eradicate humanity. To symbolize her higher status as the alpha female, she has orange markings on her tail and chest. She learns of Ryn's infant daughter Hope from Hunter, who she threatens with death if she does not join her and her colony. According to Helen, she is a tyrant. During the final battle, Tia is killed by Ryn causing the rest of Tia's followers to stop fighting and acknowledge Ryn as their new leader.

Recurring
 Chad Rook as Chris Mueller, a fisherman who was taken to the military base after being injured by Donna. He was held at the facility where he escaped with Donna, only to later fall under their power-mad influence in harvesting the merpeople and their superhuman abilities for their own purposes.
 Curtis Lum as Calvin Lee, an Asian fisherman who is also a friend and roommate of Xander. His girlfriend is Janine, who works at the Anchor cafe. In Season Three, he proposes to her and she accepts. They get married in "Til Death Do Us Part".
 Ron Yuan as Aldon Decker, an expert on merpeople who worked for the military for many years. He experimented on and became obsessed with Donna and her siren song which prompted him to drown himself once Donna herself had died.
 Gil Birmingham as Dale Bishop, the sheriff of the Bristol Cove Sheriff Department and Maddie's stepfather. He is descended from the ancient Haida people. He is the third human to discover the existence of merpeople and becomes another ally. Since the Season 3 premiere "Borders," he has been looking for Nicole at the behest of Xander. During the sound-based terror attack on Bristol Cove and its neighboring towns, Dale is among those affected. Before succumbing to it, Dale helped a crashed car where a mother driving it was affected. This left Maddie devastated and he is succeeded by Xander.
 David A. Kaye as Jerry, a man who works at Bristol Cove Marine Research Center along with Ben and Maddie. He is the one who makes fake IDs for the merpeople (thereby officially naming them) in "Oil and Water"; completely unaware of their true selves and nature.
 Garcelle Beauvais as Susan Bishop (voiced season 1, season 2), Maddie's mother and Dale's ex-wife who tries to make amends with her estranged family.
 David Cubitt as Ted Pownall, Ben's father, head of the town's fishery industry and whose great-great-great-grandfather Charles first discovered merpeople in the mid-1800s. He eventually comes to realization that his family was anything but crazy since "Revelations" when he saw Tia trying to kill him but was saved by Ryn. Now distrustful of mermaids and the probable threat they represent, he seems to have set on a dangerous path as his great-great-great-grandfather Charles had.
 Sarah-Jane Redmond as Elaine Pownall, Ben's mother who became paralyzed after a boating accident a decade earlier. She is eventually given renewed treatment from none other than aquatic stem cells from Ryn's mermaid DNA. As a byproduct, she is capable of holding her breathe underwater for about four minutes, though her legs remain somewhat paralyzed. 
 Tammy Gillis as Marissa Staub, the deputy of the Bristol Cove Sheriff's Department.
 Hannah Levien as Janine, Calvin's girlfriend who is a bartender at the Anchor. She eventually accepts his proposal, and they get married in "Til Death Do Us Part."

Supporting
 Andrew Jenkins as Doug Pownall, Ben's older brother, who is aware of the existence of merpeople. 
 Anthony Harrison as Admiral Harrison, the head of the military base in Season 1. He was most likely fired and replaced by David Kyle.
 Jill Teed as Patti McClure, the wife of the late Captain Sean McClure and the mother of Xander. Debuting in "Being Human" she expressed her sorrow at her husband's sudden demise by "getting tangled in a fishing net" and blamed Ted Pownall for letting his greed for money lead, if unintentionally, to such a tragedy. Many months later, "Entrapment", she received news that her late husband's corpse had been found and now has found peace. In "Mommy and Me" she expresses her doubts to Ted Pownall.
 Natalee Linez as Nicole Martinez, a military replacement for Decker who becomes the girlfriend of Xander. She continues Decker's research on mermaids. As of "Serenity" she has then disappeared.
 Luc Roderique as Ian Sutton, an environmentalist and news reporter who supports Ben and Maddie on bringing down the Klesco Oil Company for destroying marine life and their aquatic ecosystems in search of natural oil from the depths of the seas. He soon starts to get suspicious of Ryn and tries to take her, only to drown in the water after driving off a cliff. In order to save the merpeople and the hybrids, Ben had left him to drown.

Merpeople
Besides sisters Ryn and Donna, the following mermaid and mermen characters are:

 Sedale Threatt Jr. as Levi, a merman warrior. Mentored by Ben and considers him and Maddie friends. Levi killed Xander's dad Captain Sean McClure per Katrina's command in retribution for humans detaining and torturing Donna. He eventually learns to trust certain humans and considers Ben Pownall a friend of his kind. 
 Aylya Marzolf as Katrina, a mermaid alpha leader who was twice defeated by Ryn in combat. She is the most fierce and independent of the colony, displaying brute force against both humans and mermaids if need be. It is later revealed that she was separated from Tia's own colony/tribe as an infant, and raised by Ryn and Donna's colony. She refuses Ryn's offer to return and takes her own life by slitting her throat with Ryn's spear during the fight on an island.
 Hugo Ateo as Frank, better known as Sarge, a merman protector who becomes infatuated with Helen Hawkins and she with him. He dies during the attack on Klesco Oil Company' oil platform. Many months later, Helen finds a way to contact his essence with the help of Eliza.
 Millan Tesfazgi as Cami, a mermaid who is the daughter of the late Donna and niece of Ryn. She seeks revenge for her mother's death. Cami eventually meets her infant cousin Hope.
 Alvina August as Viv, a curly-haired mermaid from Ryn and Donna's colony who is a close friend of Eliza and Cami.
 Georgia Scarlet Waters as Eliza, a blonde mermaid from Ryn and Donna's colony. She develops a kind of romantic attraction towards Rick Marzdan. She is one of few mermaids who are healers capable of entering the echo chamber that mostly neutralizes the effects of the siren song. She eventually utilizes her knowledge of the spirit world to help Helen contact Sarge's spirit again.
 Katie Keough as Hunter, an olive-skinned mermaid from Ryn and Donna's colony. First appeared on land in "The Last Mermaid" along with Eliza, she confronted Xander McClure. She is known as a natural born hunter and fierce warrior as seen in Season 3 where she trains Ryn for battle against Tia. To avoid death, she divulges the existence of Ryn's daughter Hope to her, whom she later kidnapped. Tia later left her chained up for Ryn to find so that she can deliver a message. 
 Aryeh-Or as Ryn's Mate, an unnamed olive-skinned bearded merman whom Ryn had found in place of Levi who she couldn't find. Wanting to conceive a full-blooded merperson to ensure the survival of their colony/tribe and others, Ryn had taught him how to copulate as humans do. With aid from Helen, his sperm was taken and secretly implanted in Meredith's womb, from which his and Ryn's mermaid daughter is delivered albeit with difficulty. He eventually returns to land with Levi to take his infant daughter back, so he can teach her how to hunt.
 Deniz Akdeniz as Robb Wellens (season 3), a new acquaintance of Madelyn "Maddie" Bishop who is ultimately revealed to be a merman from a colony/tribe from Nome, Alaska. Like Tia, he is more human as Maddie had not the slightest inkling of him being otherwise and had lost his ability to change form.
 Sisse Marie and Ben Sullivan as Yura, the leader of the merpeople colony in Nome, Alaska that uses a special pool that enables a female mermaid of this tribe to become a merman for reproductive purposes. Marie portrays Yura's female form and Sullivan portrays Yura's male form.
 Alix West Lefler as Hope, the daughter of Ryn and her mate, who was secretly implanted into Meredith's uterus by her parents Bryan and Leena in order for her parents to have a full-blooded merperson grandchild of their own. A few days after her birth, her father and Levi took her into the ocean, so they could teach her how to hunt. After, she was reunited with her mother, she was taught the siren song by Ryn and she was later kidnapped by Hunter in order to bring her to Tia. Hope is rescued by Ben and is reunited with Ryn.

Human/Merpeople Hybrids
When humans and merpeople secretly mated over the centuries, they produce children with a varied blend of bloodlines, from one-eighth, to one-quarter, to half of both species. In addition to Helen, the following characters are:

 Caroline Cave as Beth Marzdan, a long-lost blood relative of Helen and the estranged sister of Rick who leads a community of human/merpeople hybrids.
 Daniel Cudmore as Bryan, a human/merman hybrid, husband of Leena, and father of Meredith, who is associated with Beth and can act hostile towards the Pownalls for their connection to Charles Pownall. When Ryn comes to ask help to have a baby, Bryan arranges for her unborn child to be secretly implanted into his daughter's uterus. After some weeks Meredith suffers from great pain but Bryan refuses to move her to a hospital so, his wife Leena, asks for Ryn's help. When Ryn, along with Cami, arrives at Bryan's house, she stays with Meredith while Cami kills Bryan, when he enters in the house.
 Brendan Fletcher (series 2) as Rick Marzdan, brother of Helen, unknown to her until revealed by a DNA test familial link.
 Kaaren de Zilva as Dr. Leena, personal physician and secretly the wife of Bryan and mother of Meredith. She secretly injected the embryo of Ryn's unborn child into her daughter in an attempt to have a full-blooded merperson grandchild of her own.
 Kiomi Pyke as Meredith, the secret daughter of Bryan and Dr. Leena who had the embryo of Ryn's unborn child implanted into her uterus in order for her parents to have a full-blooded merperson grandchild of their own. She expressed doubts at what would happen to her carrying a child that is not hers. She eventually manages to deliver Ryn's daughter, but dies as her heart could not take the strain. Ryn then told her niece, Camryn "Cami", to bury her as one of them.

Guest
Brian Anthony Wilson as Sean McClure, Xander's father and captain of the fishing motorboat The North Star. He was killed by Levi in "Dead in the Water" per orders of the alpha mermaid Katrina. Months later, his corpse accidentally resurfaces.

Episodes

Series overview

Season 1 (2018)

Season 2 (2019)

Season 3 (2020)

Production

Development
On July 25, 2016, Freeform orders a pilot titled The Deep, based on a story by Eric Wald and Dean White, who will serve as executive producers on the pilot, Wald wrote the script. Scott Stewart will direct the pilot, and Emily Whitesell will serve as the showrunner. On April 19, 2017, the series was officially picked up with the current title for broadcast in the summer of 2018. On October 7, 2017, it was announced that the series would be released on March 29, 2018 in a two-hour event. On May 15, 2018, the series was renewed for a 16-episode second season which premiered on January 24, 2019. On May 14, 2019, the series was renewed for a third season which premiered on April 2, 2020. On August 5, 2020, Freeform canceled the series after three seasons.

Casting
On August 24, 2016, Eline Powell joined the cast in the role of Po (renamed Ryn) and Rena Owen as Helen. On September 26, 2016, Ian Verdun joined the cast in the role of Xander, followed by a few days of Alex Roe and Fola Evans-Akingbola in the roles of Ben and Maddie, respectively. Chad Rook announced on May 16, 2017 via Twitter that he will be in the series playing Chris Mueller. On July 26, 2017, it was announced that Sibongile Mlambo joined the cast as regular as Donna. On August 14, 2019, Tiffany Lonsdale was cast as a new series regular for the third season.

Music 
Michael A. Levine is the former composer of Siren'''s score. The haunting and seductive Siren Call was written and composed by Levine and performed by singer/songwriter Mariana Barreto. Throughout the composition cycle, Levine incorporated the sounds of the tenor violin, octave viola (ciola), and the gusli. A soundtrack release date has yet to be announced by Freeform.

Filming
The pilot was filmed in October 2016, in Vancouver British Columbia, Canada. Pre-production started on July 26, 2017. The official shooting of the remaining episodes began on August 4, 2017, and continued until November 22, 2017. Filming for season 3 began on August 1, 2019 and ended on December 16, 2019.

Marketing
The trailer was released on April 19, 2017, the same day it was picked up. The first episode was shown at the New York Comic Con in October 2017.

 Broadcast 
In the United Kingdom, the first season premiered on SyFy on May 3, 2018. The following year, the second season premiered on February 14, 2019.

Reception

Critical reception
On the review aggregator website Rotten Tomatoes, the first season holds an approval rating of 95% based on 20 reviews, with an average rating of 8.0/10. The website's critical consensus reads, "Siren turns traditional lore on its tail with a unique, well-paced show that presents dangerous, violent mythical creatures in a surprisingly empathetic and exciting light."

Ratings
Season 1

Season 2

Season 3

Accolades

See also
 H2O: Just Add Water Mako: Island of Secrets Naagin''

References

External links

2010s American drama television series
2010s American LGBT-related drama television series
2018 American television series debuts
2020 American television series endings
2020s American drama television series
2020s American LGBT-related drama television series
American fantasy drama television series
American fantasy television series
Bisexuality-related television series
English-language television shows
Freeform (TV channel) original programming
Mermaids in television
Polyamory in fiction
Serial drama television series
Television shows filmed in Vancouver
Television shows set in Washington (state)